Paul Edward Smith (August 13, 1945 – March 14, 2000) was a collegiate and professional American football defensive end.  Smith was selected in the 1968 Common Draft by the American Football League's Denver Broncos and played in the National Football League for the Broncos and Washington Redskins.

Smith wore number 70 with the Broncos and was inducted into the Denver Broncos' Ring of Fame in 1986 along with quarterbacks Frank Tripucka and Charley Johnson.

Denver Broncos
He posted 11 sacks in 1973 (sacks did not become an official stat until 1982), as he led The Broncos to their first ever winning season (7-5-2). In his Broncos career he posted 55.5 sacks.

Personal
Smith was born in Ada, Oklahoma but raised in Roswell, New Mexico.  He lived in Aurora, Colorado until March 14, 2000 when he died of Pancreatic cancer. He has a son named Paul Smith, who has three children: Paul Smith III, Amirah, and Layana.

See also
List of American Football League players

References

1945 births
2000 deaths
Sportspeople from Ada, Oklahoma
People from Roswell, New Mexico
American football defensive ends
New Mexico Lobos football players
Denver Broncos (AFL) players
Denver Broncos players
American Conference Pro Bowl players
Washington Redskins players
Sportspeople from Aurora, Colorado
Deaths from pancreatic cancer
Deaths from cancer in Colorado